Crime of the century is a popular idiom to describe sensational criminal cases.

Crime of the Century may also refer to:

 Crime of the Century (album), a 1974 album by Supertramp and its title track
 The Crime of the Century (1933 film), directed by William Beaudine
 Crime of the Century (1946 film), directed by Philip Ford
 Guyana: Crime of the Century, a 1979 exploitation film loosely based on the Jonestown massacre
 Crime of the Century (1996 film), a 1996 made-for-TV movie about the Lindbergh kidnapping
 The Crime of the Century (TV series), 1956 British television drama
 Crime of the Century (audio drama), 2011 audio drama
 "The Crime of the Century", a song from the musical Ragtime
 Crime of the Century, a phrase referring to the Lindbergh kidnapping
 The Crime of the Century (2021 film), an HBO documentary

See also
 The Heist of the Century (disambiguation)
 Trial of the century